Thurles Greyhound Stadium is a greyhound racing track located on Castlemeadows opposite the Semple Stadium in Thurles, County Tipperary, Ireland. 

Racing takes place every Thursday and Saturday evening and the facilities include a trackside restaurant, fast food facilities, a number of bars and totalisator betting. 

The stadium has a car park which is also used for overflow parking for Semple Stadium and a farmers market on Saturday mornings. 

Race distances are 330, 525, 570 and 600 yards.

History	
Just off the Castlemeadows in Thurles is the Townpark Greyhound Stadium which opened on 13 September 1948. Major events to have taken place over the years at the track and they are called the Tipperary Cup, Guinness 575, the Champion Bitch Stakes and Puppy Stakes. A very large circumference of 509 yards allows greyhounds a good gallop although the track is considered slow. 

In 1962 the Grand National came to Townpark and would stay for 26 years until 1984 when it then moved to Shelbourne Park. The premier hurdle event in Ireland was won no less than three times by Special from 1972–1974. 

The Thurles Greyhound Racing & Sports Association Limited continually ensured that the venue was kept in good order and it held many charity nights. The Racing Manager for many years was Eamonn Bourke before Paul Hayes took over the chair. In 2011 the stadium underwent significant refurbishment resulting in an extension to the main upstairs bar areas and facilities to cater for events.

Competitions
current and former
Tipperary Cup
Grand National
National Produce Stakes

Track records
Current
  

Former

References

External links
Irish Greyhound Board

Greyhound racing venues in the Republic of Ireland
Sport in Thurles
Sport in County Tipperary
Sports venues in County Tipperary